Matthew 5:30 is the thirtieth verse of the fifth chapter of the Gospel of Matthew in the New Testament and is part of the Sermon on the Mount. Part of the section on adultery, it is very similar to the previous verse, but with the hand mentioned instead of the eye. For a discussion of the radicalism of these verses see Matthew 5:29. Jesus had stated that looking at a woman in lust is equal to the act of adultery itself and in this verse he recommends cutting off one's hand to prevent sinning.

Content
In the King James Version of the Bible the text reads:
And if thy right hand offend thee, cut it off, and 
cast it from thee: for it is profitable for thee 
that one of thy members should perish, and not 
that thy whole body should be cast into hell.

The World English Bible translates the passage as:
If your right hand causes you to stumble, cut it off, 
and throw it away from you. For it is more profitable 
for you that one of your members should perish, than 
for your whole body to be cast into Gehenna.

The Novum Testamentum Graece text is:
καὶ εἰ ἡ δεξιά σου χεὶρ σκανδαλίζει σε,
ἔκκοψον αὐτὴν καὶ βάλε ἀπὸ σοῦ
συμφέρει γάρ σοι ἵνα ἀπόληται ἓν τῶν μελῶν σου
καὶ μὴ ὅλον τὸ σῶμά σου εἰς γέενναν ἀπέλθῃ.

For a collection of other versions see BibleHub Matthew 5:30

Analysis
The link between the right hand and the discussion of adultery is somewhat unclear. In Jewish writings of the time it was common to have a foot, hand, eye triple structure. Jesus here uses two thirds of the structure, the first reference to the eye is clearly linked to his previous statement that looking at a woman lustfully is sinful, but it is uncertain why he continues to the hand when he specifically stated that action and touching is not required for sin. Hill feels that this might be related to theft as at that time the law saw adultery as a form of theft, as it was taking another man's wife. The right hand, the more active of the two among most of the population, had long been metaphorically associated with theft.

References

Sources

Further reading
France, R.T. The Gospel According to Matthew: an Introduction and Commentary. Leicester: Inter-Varsity, 1985.
Gundry, Robert H. Matthew a Commentary on his Literary and Theological Art. Grand Rapids: William B. Eerdmans Publishing Company, 1982.

05:30
Adultery
Gehenna